Wahyt Sähetmyradowiç Orazsähedow (born 26 January 1992) is a Turkmenistani football forward who plays for Altyn Asyr and Turkmenistan.

Personal life 
Wahyt Orazsähedowv was born at Babarap in Ahal Region, in a large family. The elder brother, a former professional football player, played in the Ýokary Liga, the other brother is a teacher, Orazsähedow also has a sister. In childhood, he practiced karate. He started playing football at the age of six. At the age of 10 he was recognized as the best striker at the children's tournament, after which Wahyt was invited to Ashgabat's sports boarding school.

Married in December 2016, has a daughter born in 2017.

Orazsahadov watches in his free time films in the genre of comedy or thriller. He is fluent in Russian.

Career
He started playing football in the Avadan Sports Club and the Children's and Youth Sports School in Ashgabat. He started his football career in FC Talyp Sporty. At the age of 12, a viewing was held in Moscow in one of the boarding sport school, Wahyt was taken, but subject to a change of citizenship, the father of the football player Sähetmyrat Orazsähedow opposed this. From the age of 14 he studied at the Kiev Youth Sports School №15, from where he transferred to the FC Rubin Kazan. At that time, Orazsähedow was 16 years old. At the end of 2007, he arrived in Kazan, where he spent two trainings as part of the FC Rubin Rubin youth team. Turkmen coach Kurban Berdyev approved the transfer of the young striker. In the first season, he scored 7 goals in 24 matches in Russian Youth championship.

Club

Orazsähedow made his professional debut for FC Rubin Kazan on 15 July 2009 in the Russian Cup game against FC Volga Tver.

July 2012 he transferred on loan to FC Neftekhimik Nizhnekamsk. On 13 August 2012 he scored his first goal against FC Salyut Belgorod.

17 March 2014 he joined the Moldovan team FC Dacia Chișinău. In May he made his debut for his new club in a match of the 30th round against Zimbru.

On 29 August 2014 he became a player of the Turkish club Osmanlispor. For junior team played 16 matches and scored 12 goals.

On 27 February 2015 moved to FC Rostov on a free transfer.

In June 2015 it became known that Orazsähedow had returned to Turkmenistan for military service, where he was drafted into the Central Army Sports Club (MGSK) of the Armed Forces of Turkmenistan acting in the Turkmenistan First League Beginning in the third round of the 2015 Ýokary Liga playing for FC Ashgabat.

On 9 February 2018, Sabail FK announced the signing of Orazsähedow, releasing him at the end of the 2017–18 season.

On 15 February 2019, Dordoi Bishkek announced the signing of Orazsähedow.
On 26 November 2019, Dordoi Bishkek announced the departure of Orazsähedow at the end of his contract.

In the winter of 2020, Orazsahedov signed a one-year contract with Tajikistani club FC Istiklol. Orazsahedov won his first trophy with the club in April 2020, the 2020 Tajik Super Cup. He made his debut in Tajikistan Higher League on 8 April 2020 in a 7–0 win against FC Dushanbe-83, scoring his first goal in the 25th minute. On 12 February 2021, Istiklol announced that Orazsahedov had left the club after his contract had expired.

On 11 May 2021, it was announced that Orazsahedov had signed for FC Turan.

International 

At the age of 15 years he was summoned to the Turkmenistan youth team.

In March 2011, he played in the Turkmenistan Olympic team in a match against Indonesia, Wahyt scored a goal. In June Orazsahedov played for the Olympic team full match against Syria in Jordan, scored a goal in the 2nd half, equalized his team eventually won the draw (2:2).

Orazsahedov made his senior national team debut on 11 October 2016, in an friendly match against Kyrgyzstan. He scored his first national team goal against Singapore in Asian Cup 2019 qualification match on 10 October 2017.

He has been a member of the Turkmenistan national football team since 2016. He was included in Turkmenistan's squad for the 2019 AFC Asian Cup in the United Arab Emirates.

Career statistics

Club

International
Statistics accurate as of match played 5 September 2019

International goals
Scores and results list Turkmenistan's goal tally first.

Honors

Club
Dordoi Bishkek
Kyrgyzstan League (1); 2019
Kyrgyzstan Super Cup (1): 2019

Istiklol
 Tajikistan Higher League (1): 2020
 Tajik Supercup (1): 2020

Individual
 Best scorer in Kyrgyzstan League 2019: 20 goals.

External links 
 
  Türkiye Futbol Federasyonu
  FC Rostov
  FC Neftehimik
 Profile  at national football teams.com

References

1992 births
Living people
Turkmenistan footballers
Turkmenistan expatriate footballers
FC Rubin Kazan players
Sportspeople from Ashgabat
Turkmenistan expatriate sportspeople in Russia
Turkmenistan expatriate sportspeople in Tajikistan
Expatriate footballers in Tajikistan
Expatriate footballers in Russia
Russian Premier League players
FC Dacia Chișinău players
Ankaraspor footballers
Association football forwards
FC Aşgabat players
FC Rostov players
FC Ahal players
Sabail FK players
2019 AFC Asian Cup players
FC Neftekhimik Nizhnekamsk players
FC Dordoi Bishkek players
Turkmenistan expatriate sportspeople in Kyrgyzstan
Kyrgyz Premier League players
Expatriate footballers in Moldova
Turkmenistan expatriate sportspeople in Moldova
Moldovan Super Liga players
Tajikistan Higher League players
FC Istiklol players
Turkmenistan international footballers
Turkmenistan expatriate sportspeople in Kazakhstan
Expatriate footballers in Kazakhstan
FC Turan players